Richard "Dick" Alexander Milliken (born 2 September 1950) is a former Ireland international rugby union player.

Education
Milliken is a geography graduate of Queen's University in Belfast.

Rugby playing career
He toured South Africa in 1974 with the British and Irish Lions and at the time played club rugby for Bangor.

Unhappily the following year (1975) he broke his leg and ankle together playing rugby. Following the injury he never regained his full athletic capabilities and was unable to add to his 14 Irish Caps. Nevertheless, he continued to play rugby for his home town Bangor and captained the 2nd Team in the 1977/78 season.

Business career
Milliken was a chartered accountant, CEO of Investment Bank of Ireland CEO, a director of Bank of Ireland Mortgage Bank, and a non-executive director of Ryanair.

References

1950 births
Living people
Irish rugby union players
British & Irish Lions rugby union players from Ireland
Ireland international rugby union players
People educated at Bangor Grammar School
Ulster Rugby players